Tommie Ginn (born January 25, 1958) is a former professional American football player who played center for two seasons for the Detroit Lions.

References

1958 births
American football offensive guards
American football centers
Detroit Lions players
Arkansas Razorbacks football players
Living people
People from Scotia, California